Nadeyevshchina is a rural locality (a village) in Yenangskoye Rural Settlement, Kichmengsko-Gorodetsky District, Vologda Oblast, Russia. The population was 33 as of 2002.

Geography 
Nadeyevshchina is located 75 km southeast of Kichmengsky Gorodok (the district's administrative centre) by road. Kekur is the nearest rural locality.

References 

Rural localities in Kichmengsko-Gorodetsky District